India  competed in the 2020 Summer Paralympics in Tokyo, Japan, from 24 August to 5 September 2021. Indian athletes have appeared in every edition of the Summer Paralympics since 1984, though they made their official debut at the 1968 Summer Paralympics. This was India's most successful Paralympic season with 5 golds 8 silvers and 6 bronzes (total 19). Before this edition, India had won 12 medals (4 medals of each color) of all previous Paralympics appearances combined.

Table tennis player Bhavina Patel won India's first olympics (Paralympic) medal in Table Tennis. Shooter Avani Lekhara scripted history as she became the first Indian to win a medal in Shooting in the Paralympics. She also became the first Indian woman to win a gold medal and become multiple medalist in Paralympics. Another shooter Singhraj Adhana won two medals - Silver in Mixed 50m pistol SH1 category and Bronze in Men's 10m air rifle SH1 category.

Archer Harvinder Singh became the first Indian to win a medal in Archery at the olympics (Paralympic). He won a bronze medal in Men's Recurve Individual. In badminton Indian shuttler won a record number of medals including two golds (Pramod Bhagat - Men's singles SL3, Krishna Nagar - Men's singles SH6) one silver (Suhas Yathiraj - Men's Singles Badminton SL4) and one bronze (Manoj Sarkar - Men's Singles Badminton SL3). Mariyappan Thangavelu and Devendra Jhajharia won consecutive medals in their respective category (they both won gold in Rio 2016). They both won silver medals. Devendra's silver at the Tokyo Games took his overall individual tally to three medals and he's now level with legendary Paralympian Joginder Singh Bedi who also has three medals to his name at the Paralympic Games. In Javelin throw F64 another Indian Sumit Antil won agold medal (68.55 m) with new world record.

Indian discus thrower Vinod Kumar lost his F52 category bronze medal after being found ineligible in the disability classification assessment. Mariyappan Thangavelu was originally the flag  bearer but because of quarantine, the flag bearer was changed to Tek Chand.

Medalists

|style="text-align:left;width:60%;vertical-align:top"|

Medals by Sport, Gender and Day 

|style="text-align:left;width:20%;vertical-align:top"|

Competitors 
This year India sent its largest contingent of all time.

Archery 

India archers achieved quota places for the following events from the 2019 World Para Archery Championships.

Harvinder Singh and Vivek Chikara became the first male archers from the country to qualify for the games. They achieved this feat by finishing in the Top 16 in the World Championship. Rakesh Kumar and Shyam Sundar Swami also qualified from the World Championship. Jyoti Baliyan got the Bipartite Commission invitation to participate in the tournament.

Men 

|-
|align=left|Harvinder Singh
|align=left rowspan=2|Individual Recurve Open
|600
|21
|rowspan=2 
|W 6–5
|W 6–5
|W 6–2
|L 4–6
|W 6–5
|
|-
|align=left|Vivek Chikara
|609
|10
|W 6–2
|L 3–7
|colspan=3|Did not advance
|9
|-
|align=left|Rakesh Kumar
|align=left rowspan=2|Individual Compound Open
|699
|3
|
|W 144–131 
|W 140–137
|L 143–145
|colspan=2|Did not advance
|5
|-
|align=left|Shyam Sundar Swami
|682
|21
|
|L 139–142
|colspan=4|Did not advance
|17
|}

Women 

|-
|Jyoti Baliyan
|Individual Compound Open
|671
|15
| L 137–141
|colspan=4|Did not advance
|17
|}

Mixed

Athletics 

The following Indian athletes achieved the quota places by finishing in the top 4 at the 2019 World Para Athletics Championship in Dubai, Qualification Ranking Allocation, Qualification Ranking Allocation, and High-Performance Allocation.

India secured qualification through World Championship and via World Rankings. 

The Paralympic Committee of India announced the final list of the athletes after completing the selection trials in New Delhi.

Men 
Field

Women 
Track

Field

Badminton 

Badminton made its debut at the Paralympic Games. Following Indian shuttlers qualified for the games based on qualification rankings or bipartite invitation.

Men

Women

Mixed

Paracanoeing 

Women
Prachi Yadav became India's first Paracanoe athlete at the Tokyo Paralympics. She got quota after finishing 8th in ICF Championship 2019.

Powerlifting 

Sakina Khatun and Jaideep Deswal received the bipartite invitation to participate in the games. Sakina became the first-ever female powerlifter from the country to participate in the games. While this was Jaideep's second Paralympics, he has represented the country at the 2012 Games in Athletics.

Shooting 

Indian shooters achieved quota places for the following events by their best finishes at the 2018 World Shooting Para Sport Championships, 2018 World Shooting Para Sport World Cup, Châteauroux, 2019 World Shooting Para Sport World Cup, Al Ain, and 2019 World Shooting Para Sport Championships, Sydney. Each athlete from each NPC must at least aim to score targets in each medalling event in the qualifying tournaments.

Manish Narwal and Deepender Singh became the first Indian Para Pistol shooter to qualify for the Paralympic Games after winning gold and silver medal at the 2018 World Shooting Para Sport World Cup, Châteauroux. Later Singhraj also joined them by securing a berth in the mixed pistol event. Avani Lekhera becomes the first female shooter to secure a Paralympic berth for India. Swaroop Mahavir Unhalkar secured another quota in the rifle from the 2019 World Shooting Para Sport Championships, Sydney. Later Siddhartha Babu also secured qualified from the same tournament. Deepak Saini, Rahul Jakahar, Akash, and Rubina Francis secured the quota places from the 2021 Para Sport World Cup, Lima.

Paralympic Committee of India, on 8 July 2021 announced the 10-member Indian Team for the Tokyo 2021 games.

Men

Women 

EWR- Equalled World Record; PR- Paralympic Record

Mixed

Swimming 

One Indian swimmer has successfully entered the Paralympic slot after Suyash Jadhav achieved the MQS. Later, Niranjan Mukundan received bi-partite invitation.

Men

DNS - Did not start; DSQ- Disqualified

Table tennis 

India entered two athletes into the table tennis competition at the games. Bhavina Hasmukhbhai Patel and Sonalben Manubhai Patel qualified via overall Rankings allocation.

Women

Taekwondo

India qualified one athlete to compete at the Paralympics competition. Aruna Tanwar received the bipartite commission invitation allocation quotas for women's – 49 kg events. Aruna withdrew before her repechage round match due to a hairline fracture.

Women

See also 
 India at the Paralympics
 India at the 2020 Summer Olympics

References 

2020
Nations at the 2020 Summer Paralympics
2021 in Indian sport